Nikolai Bulin (clerical name: John (Bulin); 28 February 1893 Võõpsu, Kreis Werro, Governorate of Livonia – 30 July 1941 Leningrad) was an orthodox clergyman.

1920-1932, he was the head of Pechory Monastery.

He was a member of the IV and V Riigikogu. He was arrested by the NKVD on 18 October 1940, sentenced to death on 8 April 1941 and shot on 30 July 1941 in Leningrad.

References

1893 births
1941 deaths
People from Räpina Parish
People from Kreis Werro
Estonian people of Russian descent
Eastern Orthodox priests from the Russian Empire
Bishops of the Estonian Apostolic Orthodox Church
Members of the Riigikogu, 1929–1932
Members of the Riigikogu, 1932–1934
Estonian people executed by the Soviet Union
Eastern Orthodox people executed by the Soviet Union